Senator Prentice may refer to:

Judson Prentice (1810–1886), Wisconsin State Senate
Margarita Prentice (born 1931), Washington State Senate

See also
C. J. Prentiss (fl. 1980s–2000s), Ohio State Senate
Samuel Prentiss (1782–1857), U.S. Senator from Vermont from 1831 to 1842